The 1965–66 Israel State Cup (Gvia HaMedina) was the 27th season of Israel's nationwide football cup competition and the 12th after the Israeli Declaration of Independence.

A rule change was instituted this season, so that in the event of a tie at the end of 90 minutes and extra time, there will be a penalty shoot-out, instead of a replay. The first two penalty shoot-outs of the competition occurred on the first round, played on 18 September 1965, with Hapoel Shefayim besting Hapoel Givat Haim 4–3, and with Hapoel Sha'ar HaNegev winning over Hapoel Ramat David with the same result.

The quarter-finals, semi-finals and the final itself were all played within one week, between 1 June 1966 and 8 June 1966. Hapoel Haifa and Shimshon Tel Aviv met at the final, the former winning 2–1 to claim its second cup.

Results

Fourth Round
The 32 second round winners were joined in this round by the teams from Liga Alef. Matches were played on 29 January 1966

Fifth Round

Sixth Round

Seventh Round

Quarter-finals

Semi-finals

Final

Notes

References
100 Years of Football 1906-2006, Elisha Shohat (Israel), 2006

External links
 Israel Football Association website

Israel State Cup
State Cup
Israel State Cup seasons